Leon van Dijk (born 9 March 1992) is a former Dutch footballer.

Club career
He started his career in the combined youth department of FC Twente and Go Ahead Eagles.

Later, at the end of the 2011–12 season, van Dijk transferred to Heracles Almelo.

Heracles Almelo
Leon van Dijk transferred from the combined youth department of FC Twente and Go Ahead Eagles to Heracles Almelo at the end of the 2010–11 season. He signed a two-year contract with the option of an extra year. 

Van Dijk only played 4 matches as a professional, he moved to amateur team HSC '21 in 2014.

References

External links
 Voetbal International profile 

1992 births
Living people
Footballers from Enschede
Dutch footballers
Association football defenders
Heracles Almelo players
Eredivisie players
HSC '21 players